Pascal Langlois, better known as Pascal Langdale, is an English actor and voice actor. He has played supporting roles in a number of television dramas since 1999. Langdale also lent his voice and likeness to the critically acclaimed video game Heavy Rain, in which he played Ethan Mars. He studied at the Royal Academy of Dramatic Art for 3 years. Langdale also runs a company "Collective Intent", that assists in facial capture, and Behavior Libraries for video games. Pascal co-wrote and performed in "Faster Than Night", a "Live-animated interactive drama" chosen to be part of Toronto's Harbourfront HATCH 2014 festival.

Filmography

Films

Television

Video games

Other media
From 2011 to 2014, Langdale appeared in television advertisements for The National Lottery, playing the role of a millionaire named Hector Riva. The advertisements included him preparing to go to space, him on his private island, him scuba diving off his private yacht, and flying in his private jet.  He has also appeared in advertisements for Saint Agur blue cheese.

References

External links
 

Living people
English male video game actors
Alumni of RADA
English male film actors
English male television actors
Year of birth missing (living people)